Congregation Rodef Sholom, founded in 1956, is a Reform Jewish Congregation located on the Lonee C. Hoytt Jewish Campus in San Rafael, California. Prior to its establishment, Shabbat services were held at the Marin Jewish Community Center, established in 1946 at Mission and Forbes Street. The congregation met at the center until 1962 when it moved to its current location. The congregation shares a campus with the Osher Marin JCC and the Brandeis Hillel Day School. Rodef Sholom has been affiliated with the Union for Reform Judaism since 1957. The congregation receives its name, meaning "pursuers of peace," from a Talmudic quote by Rabbi Hillel: "Be among the disciples of Aaron, loving peace and pursuing peace, loving people and bringing them closer to the Torah."

History

During the 1940s the Marin Jewish community would gather at houses in the community for Shabbat services.  B'nai B'rith, Hadassah, and Council of Jewish Women also established chapters within the county, and in 1948, the Marin Jewish Community Center was opened at 1618 Mission Avenue. The JCC held kabbalat shabbat and shabbat services each week in its sanctuary, and out of these services grew Rodef Sholom in 1956 and Kol Shofar in 1962.

Congregation Rodef Sholom was founded in 1956 by Harry Albert, Abe Blumenfeld, Sidney Braverman, Samuel B. Herst, David J. Rosenberg, Sidney Rudey, Aaron Schwartz, and Julius Selinger. The congregation grew from 64 families upon establishment to 143 by the high holy days. Rabbi Julius A. Liebert and Cantor Louis Roller, the congregation's first clergy, led services in the JCC sanctuary. The temple sisterhood, then called the Ladies Auxiliary, formed that same year. During its first year, membership was divided between a Reform or Conservative affiliation. However, in 1957, under the direction of Rabbi Morton Hoffman, Rodef Sholom formally became a Reform congregation by joining the Union of American Hebrew Congregations. By 1959, the Jewish population of Marin County was 2,700 with 225 families belonging to Rodef Sholom, and over 300 children attending its religious school.

On June 4, 1961, after 4 years of fundraising, the community held a groundbreaking ceremony for its new synagogue, which would be completed and dedicated on May 4, 1962. Jane Slater Marquis and Claude Stoller designed the architecture of the building. The new building featured a stained glass window in the hexagonal high ceiling that was donated by the Koch family, stained glass windows at the front entrance donated by Mrs. Harry Albert, and an organ from the Men's Club. Rabbi Morton Hoffman left the congregation in 1970, and Rabbi David Davis became the new senior rabbi, serving for 7 years.

In 1977 Rabbi Michael Barenbaum was hired to lead the congregation. That same year the congregation began holding high holy day services at the Marin County Civic Center, which allowed for the entire congregation to worship together. Several associate rabbis served under Rabbi Barenbaum including Rabbi Robert Daum (1986–1993), Rabbi Miriam Baitch (1982–1986), and Rabbi Lee Bycel (1979–1982). Barenbaum became Rodef Sholom's longest serving rabbi when he retired in 2003 after 27 years of service. Barenbaum was honored by Senator Barbara Boxer on a February 2003 session. During his tenure, the congregation's numbers grew from 300 members to 1,100 families. In 2003, after 10 years of service as Rodef Sholom's associate rabbi, Rabbi Stacy Friedman became senior rabbi.

In 2009, Rodef Sholom received a Next Dor grant from Synagogue 3000 to develop its NITA program, led by Rabbi Noa Kushner.  The program's name, NITA, comes from the Hebrew word meaning "we will grow," and aims to bring unaffiliated Generation X and Y Jews into a comfortable non-synagogue environment where they can "do Jewish stuff." The group meets for havdalah, hikes, storahtelling, and once-monthly kabbalat shabbat services.

Religious school

In 1944, the first Jewish organization in Marin was formed, the Marin Jewish Sunday School Association, which arose out of the need for standardized Jewish education within the community. Throughout the next few decades classes met at Marin Country Day School, Tamalpais High School, the International Order of Odd Fellows lodge, Scout Hall, and the San Anselmo Library. On November 12, 1965, Rodef Sholom's Religious School building was dedicated.  In 1967, vandals burned down Blumenfeld Hall, and some classes were held at Blessed Sacrament Church during the rebuilding.

Brandeis Hillel Day School established its Marin campus in the facility in 1978. The school is accredited by the California Association of Independent Schools and the Western Association of Schools and Colleges, and affiliated with the Bureau of Jewish Education, RAVSAK, Northern California Jewish Community Day School Network, National Association of Independent Schools, and JESNA.

Clergy

Current
 Senior Rabbi Stacy Friedman - (Associate Rabbi: 1993 - 2003; Senior Rabbi since 2003) Ordained at the Hebrew Union College-Jewish Institute of Religion in 1993.
 Cantor David Margules - (Cantor since 1991) Master of Arts degree in sacred music from the Hebrew Union College Jewish Institute of Religion in 1987.
 Rabbi-Cantor Elana Rosen-Brown (Associate Rabbi since 2017; Assistant Rabbi 2014–2017) Ordained in New York by Hebrew Union College-Jewish Institute of Religion in 2012 as cantor and 2014 as rabbi.

Past clergy
 Rabbi Emeritus Michael Barenbaum (1977–2003) Ordained at the Hebrew Union College Jewish Institute of Religion in Cincinnati.
 Rabbi Michael Lezak - (Associate Rabbi 2003–2017) Ordained in New York by Hebrew Union College-Jewish Institute of Religion in 1999.
 Rabbi Noa Kushner - (Assistant Rabbi, 2005–2011) Ordained in New York by the Hebrew Union College-Jewish Institute of Religion in 1998.
 Rabbi David Davis (1968–1976)
 Rabbi Morton Hoffman (1957–1968)
 Rabbi Julius A. Liebert (1956–1957)
 Rabbi Robert Daum (1986–1993)
 Rabbi Miriam Baitch (1982–1986)
 Rabbi Lee Bycel (1979–1982) 
 Cantor Brian Reich
 Cantor Steven Puzarne
 Cantor Rita Glassman (1986–1991)

References

External links
Congregation Rodef Sholom Official site.
NITA
Union for Reform Judaism: Rodef Sholom Directory listing.

Reform synagogues in California
Jewish organizations established in 1956
Synagogues in Marin County, California
Buildings and structures in San Rafael, California